In the years before the outbreak of World War I in 1914, the French Navy considered several proposals for battlecruisers. The Navy issued specifications for a battlecruiser design to complete part of the 28 capital ships to be built by 1920. Three designs, one by P. Gille and two by Lieutenant Durand-Viel, were completed in 1913. The first two called for the same  gun used on all French super-dreadnoughts, though the third proposed a much more powerful  gun. Though the design studies were complete, the French Navy did not authorize or begin construction of any battlecruisers before the start of the war.

Background 
In the Naval Law of 30 March 1912, the French Navy called for a total force of 20 capital ships to be built by 1920. The Technical Branch subsequently issued a set of somewhat vague requirements for battlecruiser designs. These figures were very similar to the British s then under construction. Numerous proposals were submitted to the Technical Branch, but only two were evaluated further. As the proposals were only design studies, none were authorized and no ships were built; the outbreak of World War I ensured that even more advanced projects, like the Normandie and s were canceled as resources were redirected toward more pressing needs.

Gille's design 

In 1911, Gille went to Britain to observe the construction of the new s and the Lion-class battlecruisers. The latter ships prompted Gille to decide the French Navy ought to build battlecruisers as well, since Britain and Germany had already begun acquiring them, and they would prove useful as a fast division of the French fleet. They would also need enough armor and a main battery powerful enough to fight in the line of battle. The limitations that weight imposed on the design, however, restricted the amount of armor possible, and so the traditional French practice of armoring the entire side of the ship would be impossible.

Characteristics 

The hull lines of the ships proved to be highly efficient in tank tests during the design process. Due to the extreme weight of the main battery turrets at the bow and stern, the hull had to be strengthened to handle the strain. Very strong longitudinal bracing was incorporated, and the inner and outer skins of the hull was thickened to reinforce the bracings. Each ship would be crewed by 41 officers and 1,258 enlisted men.

The ships would have been equipped with four sets of steam turbines rated at  powered by fifty-two coal-fired Belleville boilers. Each propeller shaft was connected to a high-pressure turbine, a medium-pressure geared turbine, and a low-pressure turbine for forward steaming, and a direct drive turbine for steaming in reverse. The ships' top speed was to have been 28 knots.

The ships' main armament was composed of twelve 340mm/45 Modèle 1912 guns in three quadruple turrets, the same as in the contemporary French battleships of the Normandie class. One turret was placed forward, and the other two were placed in a superfiring pair, all on the centerline. A secondary battery of twenty-four 138.6 mm /55 Modèle 1910 guns mounted in casemates was planned for defense against torpedo boats. The armament was rounded out by six torpedo tubes of undetermined diameter, all submerged in the ships' hulls.

The ships were also equipped with a 20 mm thick torpedo bulkhead.

Durand-Viel's designs 

In 1913, the Naval College had several of its students submit design studies for a fast capital ship. Durand-Viel drew up a pair of designs, which were evaluated by the General Staff in June 1914. He saw his ships forming a fast division of the battle fleet capable of encircling an enemy squadron; as with Gille's design, this required heavy armament and armor to permit the ships to engage battleships.

Project "A" characteristics 
The ships would have been equipped with four sets of direct drive turbines rated at  powered by twenty-four double-ended Belleville boilers that burned both coal and oil. The ships' top speed was to have been .

The ships' main armament was composed of eight 340mm/45 Modèle 1912 guns in two quadruple turrets, the same as in the contemporary French battleships of the Normandie class. Both turrets were placed on the centerline, on either end of the ship. A secondary battery of twenty-four 138.6 mm Modèle 1910 guns mounted in casemates was planned for defense against torpedo boats. Four  saluting guns were also to be equipped. The armament was rounded out by four  torpedo tubes, all submerged in the ships' hulls. The rest of the ship's armor was very similar to that of the Normandie class.

Project "B" characteristics 

Durand-Viel's second battlecruiser design, "B", was built on the same displacement as the first design. The heavier weight of the increased main battery was offset by a reduction in the armor protection for the secondary guns and improved performance of the ship's propulsion system. Steam was provided by eighteen Belleville boilers, ten of which that burned both coal and oil, and eight that were oil-fired only. The ships' top speed was to have been  for the first variant and 27 knots for the second. The ships would have been supplied with the same fuel allotment as the "A" design, with the same radius of action as well.

The ships' main armament was composed of eight  guns in two quadruple turrets. Both turrets were placed on the centerline, on either end of the ship. A secondary battery for defense against torpedo boats consisted of twenty-eight 138.6 mm guns, of a new semi-automatic design, mounted in casemates. Four 47 mm saluting guns were also to be installed. The should would also to have carried four 450 mm torpedo tubes, all submerged in the ships' hulls. The ships' armor system was identical to the "A" design.

Notes

References 
 
 
 
 

Proposed ships
Battlecruiser classes